Arcadia is an extinct genus of temnospondyl amphibians in the family Rhytidosteidae from the early Triassic. The remains were found in and named after the Arcadia Formation of Australia.

See also 
 Prehistoric amphibian
 List of prehistoric amphibians

References 

Triassic temnospondyls of Australia
Fossil taxa described in 1985